Aire View is a linear settlement in the civil parish of Cononley, North Yorkshire, England.

Aire View holds one Grade II listed building, the late 17th to early 18th century Aire View Farmhouse with barn.

References

Villages in North Yorkshire